Zuzanna Bijoch (born 20 June 1994 in Katowice, Poland) is a Polish fashion model.

Career 
Bijoch was discovered at a modeling competition in Poland and booked a Prada campaign while in high school. She debuted at Georges Chakra in 2010 and walked for the spring Jason Wu, Topshop Unique, Salvatore Ferragamo, Marni, and Prada; she Miu Miu exclusive in the S/S 2011 season and did a Prada campaign. For her work with Alexander McQueen, Valentino, Gucci, and Chloé, she was ranked on models.com’s “Top 50” list from 2014. She has also modeled for Givenchy, Marc Jacobs and a Louis Vuitton campaign. Bijoch walked over 50 shows in the 2011/12 season including Thakoon, Narciso Rodriguez, Nina Ricci, Victoria Beckham, Gianfranco Ferré, Moschino, and Balenciaga (which she closed).

Bijoch has been a guest judge on Poland’s Top Model.

Personal life 
Bijoch is a student at Columbia University.

References 

Living people
1994 births
Polish female models
People from Katowice
Next Management models
Columbia University alumni